This article lists the election results of the European Greens (and its predecessors) in the national parliamentary, European parliamentary, local council, and regional elections.

European Parliament 

Popular voteSeats

National Parliaments

Austria

Belgium

Bulgaria

Cyprus

Czechia

Denmark

References

European Green Party